Georgios Christodoulis (born 4 January 2001) is a Greek professional footballer who plays as a goalkeeper for Super League club Ionikos.

References

2001 births
Living people
Greek footballers
Super League Greece players
Football League (Greece) players
Gamma Ethniki players
Pierikos F.C. players
Iraklis Thessaloniki F.C. players
Ionikos F.C. players
Association football goalkeepers
Footballers from Katerini